Croxley Green is both a village and a suburb of Rickmansworth in Hertfordshire, England. It is also a civil parish.

Croxley Green has changed considerably in the years since John Dickinson built paper mills in the area. The area has grown into a semi-urban community, thanks to Croxley tube station on the Metropolitan line providing connections to London's West End at Baker Street and stations through to the City at Aldgate.

The population at the 2011 Census was 12,562. Croxley Green is a part of the UK Parliament constituency, South West Hertfordshire. Gagan Mohindra is the Member of Parliament since the December 2019 United Kingdom general election.

History
Croxley Green has a large village green. The Croxley Green Windmill was built  and survives today converted to residential accommodation.

The Green holds an annual village fair, the "Revels on The Green",  which includes a traditional maypole dance. The revels were featured in Metro-land, the 1973 television documentary by John Betjeman, who referred to them as a tradition dating back to 1952. Since 2006, the Parish Council has organised a firework display on The Green for New Year's Eve.

In 1830, John Dickinson built Croxley Mill adjacent to the Grand Junction Canal, since 1929 part of the Grand Union Canal. John Dickinson Stationery produced Croxley Script.  Dickinson Square and Dickinson Avenue are named after the paper mill owner and contain houses built by the company for their workers at the end of the 19th century. The mill closed in 1980.

Croxley Green was historically part of the parish of Rickmansworth, which was included in the Watford Poor Law Union from 1835. When sanitary districts were created in 1872, the parish of Rickmansworth, including Croxley Green, therefore became part of the Watford Rural Sanitary District, which in turn became Watford Rural District in 1894.

Rickmansworth Urban District was created on 15 April 1898, with Croxley Green being part of Rickmansworth Urban District until its abolition when Three Rivers District was created on 1 April 1974. The former Rickmansworth Urban District then became an unparished area, governed directly by Three Rivers District Council. The civil parish of Croxley Green was created on 1 April 1986, covering the eastern part of the former Rickmansworth Urban District and an adjoining area transferred from the parish of Sarratt.

Croxley Common Moor to the south of the village, OS grid reference , is a  biological Site of Special Scientific Interest (SSSI) and Local Nature Reserve. In 2008 a group of residents were successful in gaining village green status for Buddleia Wood, a small area of woodland to the south of the village, thereby protecting the area for generations to come. The village signs were replaced in February 2008 with a scene of All Saints Church and The Green.

Rail

Train services are provided from Croxley station on the Watford branch of the London Underground Metropolitan line, providing connections to London's West End at Baker Street and stations through to the City at Aldgate. The journey is between 40 and 45 minutes to Baker Street, and 60 minutes to the terminus at Aldgate.

There was previously a Croxley Green railway station which was the terminus for a branch line from Watford that even featured a small goods yard. The goods yard was lost to housing after closing in 1966, with the line itself closing to passengers 30 years later in 1996. The track bed of the former line was going to be reused as part of the Croxley Rail Link plans to divert the Metropolitan Line to Watford Junction, but these plans were shelved by London Mayor Sadiq Khan.

Churches
C of E All Saints' Church, The Green
C of E St Oswald's Church, Malvern Way
Christ First Watford, Fuller Way
Croxley Green Baptist Church, Baldwin's Lane
Croxley Green Methodist Church, New Road
Roman Catholic, St Bede's, Baldwins Lane
Croxley Green Christian Assembly

Local organisations
Croxley Green has a Residents Association and a Parish Council. There are local organisations dedicated to pastimes and leisure. The Croxley Green Society runs the "Revels", an event hosted on The Green in June/July every year. There are varying clubs including the camera, needlecraft, wine, vineyard, bicycle, jazz, and folk. Additionally there is an annual free of charge festival, called 'CroxFest', which takes place on The Green in September.

Notable residents
 Barbara Woodhouse the dog trainer presented Training Dogs the Woodhouse Way on television in the 1980s and lived at Campions from the 1940s to the 1980s.
 Fred Housego, the 1980 BBC Mastermind winner, and sometime London black cab driver.
 Ron Tarr, a British actor, best known for playing the part of "Big Ron" in EastEnders, lived in Durrants Drive. In a report about Tarr's death in the Daily Mirror, journalist Chris Hughes stated the character had "a cult following".
 Dave Edwards/Mr Christmas, local resident whose extensive annual Christmas lights display, on his house in Lancing Way, raised money for charity and was featured in national news  and on TV

Schools
Morris Minors Pre School 
Malvern Way Infant and Nursery School 
Little Green Junior School 
Harvey Road Primary School 
Yorke Mead Primary School 
Rickmansworth School
Croxley Danes School, built between 2017 and 2020.

York House School
York House School is an independent preparatory day school for girls and boys aged from 3 to 13 years of age, located on Sarratt Road near Croxley Green in Redhead, an eighteenth-century mansion. The current features date variously from 1712, 1743 and 1866.

The school was founded in Hampstead in 1910 by Rev. Cambridge Victor Hawkins. It relocated to Rickmansworth in the late 1940s, then moved again to its current location in 1966. The school motto is "Aut Viam Inveniam Aut Faciam", which is Latin for "Either I shall find a way or I shall make one". The school's alumni are referred to as Old Yorkists.

References

External links

Croxley Green Parish Council
Croxley Green Residents Association Website
Croxley Green Website
Croxley Revels
Croxley Great Barn
Croxley Green Parish Boundary Walk on WildþingUK
York House School

Three Rivers District
Villages in Hertfordshire
Civil parishes in Hertfordshire